The monticulus of the cerebellum is divided by the primary fissure (or preclival fissure) into an anterior, raised part, the culmen or summit, and a posterior sloped part, the clivus; the quadrangular lobule is similarly divided.

Additional images

See also 

 Anatomy of the cerebellum

References

External links

 https://web.archive.org/web/20080614064333/http://www.ib.amwaw.edu.pl/anatomy/atlas/image_06e.htm

Cerebellum